Mişätamaq /mee-shah-tah-MAHQ/, was a Tatar rebel castle, which was constructed during the Kazan War for the restoration of the Khanate of Kazan in 1552-1556. It was built in 1553 in the confluence of Myosha River and  Kama River. It was situated 60 km south of Kazan (today Taşkirmän village (?!)). In 1556 the castle was besieged and ruined by troops of Ivan the Terrible.

Çalım

History of Tatarstan
Khanate of Kazan
Defunct towns in Russia
Former populated places in Russia